Antoinette Smythe Garnes (about 1887 – July 2, 1938) was an American soprano singer active in the 1920s in the United States.

Education 
Antoinette Smythe Garnes was born about 1887, in Detroit. She studied at Detroit Central High School, Detroit Conservatory of Music, Howard University, and Chicago Musical College; at the last institution she studied with Edoardo Sacerdote, earned a bachelor of music degree in 1919, and was the college's first black winner of the Alexander Revell diamond medal. She also played violin and piano. She earned a master of music degree from Chicago Musical College in 1920.

Career 
In 1923 Garnes was the only African American member of the Chicago Grand Opera Company. She was a member of the Chicago Opera Association. Erma Morris accompanied her for a performance in Detroit. She sang at a meeting of the NAACP in Chicago in 1919. Music critic Agnes Beldon noted Garnes's "sterling vocal ability and fine training". Her solo recitals were sponsored by local black women's clubs, and benefited charities such as the Phyllis Wheatley Orphan's Home in Wichita. She performed with Naida McCullough in California in 1932.

Garnes taught voice at Lincoln University, Wilberforce University and Hampton Institute. She recorded on Harry Pace's Black Swan Records,  and her recording of two arias was promoted as "the first grand opera record ever made by a colored singer."  She was given an honorary membership in the Alpha Kappa Alpha sorority at the organization's boule (annual meeting) in 1923.

Personal life 
Antoinette Smythe Garnes married twice; her first husband was Rev. T. J. Smythe. She was widowed when he died in Chicago. Her second husband was dentist Harry W. Garnes. She died from liver disease in 1938, in Cape Girardeau, Missouri.

Discography
"Caro Nome" (1923) Black Swan Records  7101
"Ah, F'ors 'E Lui" (1923) Black Swan Records 7102
"My Mother Bids Me Bind My Hair" Black Swan Records

References

External links 

 Antoinette Garnes singing "Caro nome", circa 1922, on YouTube.
 Antoinette Garnes singing "My Mother Bids Me Bind My Hair", on YouTube.

1938 deaths
Place of birth missing
20th-century African-American women singers
20th-century American women opera singers
African-American women opera singers
Howard University alumni
Hampton University faculty
Wilberforce University faculty
Chicago Musical College alumni
American operatic sopranos
Lincoln University (Missouri) faculty
Year of birth uncertain
1880s births